Ardleigh railway station served the village of Ardleigh in Essex, England.  The station was situated on the Great Eastern Main Line.

History
Opened by the Eastern Union Railway, then absorbed by the Great Eastern Railway, it joined the London and North Eastern Railway during the Grouping of 1923. The line then passed on to the Eastern Region of British Railways on nationalisation in 1948.

There were sidings on both the down and up side at the London end of the station. Those on the up side included goods sheds  and handled both horticultural and seed traffics until the goods service was closed on 7 December 1964.

The station was then closed for passenger traffic by the British Railways Board on 6 November 1967.

The site today
Trains pass the site on the electrified Great Eastern Main Line.

References

Further reading

External links
 Ardleigh station on navigable 1948 O. S. map

Disused railway stations in Essex
Former Great Eastern Railway stations
Railway stations in Great Britain opened in 1846
Railway stations in Great Britain closed in 1967
1846 establishments in England
Tendring